Cwm Twrch is a Site of Special Scientific Interest (SSSI) in Carmarthenshire, Wales.

SSSI

The site is notable for its geology, where river erosion provides the best exposes the Amman Marine Band, a sedimentary layer showing a diverse fauna, and which marks the Westphalian A – Westphalian B boundary in this Carboniferous rock strata.

See also
List of Sites of Special Scientific Interest in Carmarthenshire

References

External links
SSSI Citation for Cwm Twrch
Citation map for Cwm Twrch
Your Special Site and its Future - Cwm Twrch SSSI overview from Natural Resources Wales
Cwm Twrch SSSI marked on DEFRA's MAGIC Map

Sites of Special Scientific Interest in Carmarthen & Dinefwr